Ashutosh Maurya (alias Raju) is an Indian politician and a member of the Sixteenth Legislative Assembly of Uttar Pradesh in India. He represents the Bisauli constituency of Uttar Pradesh and is a member of the Samajwadi Party political party.

Political career
Ashutosh Maurya has been a MLA for one term. He represented the Bisauli constituency and is a member of the Samajwadi Party political party.

He lost his seat in the 2017 Uttar Pradesh Assembly election to Kushagra Sagar of the Bharatiya Janata Party.

Posts held

See also
 Bisauli (Assembly constituency)
 Sixteenth Legislative Assembly of Uttar Pradesh
 Uttar Pradesh Legislative Assembly

References 

Samajwadi Party politicians
Uttar Pradesh MLAs 2012–2017
People from Budaun district
1976 births
Living people
Uttar Pradesh MLAs 2022–2027